Nguyễn Chí Thanh (1 January 1914 – 6 July 1967)  was a General in the North Vietnamese Vietnam People's Army and former North Vietnamese politician. Nguyễn Chí Thanh was born in Thừa Thiên Province in Central Vietnam to a peasant family. His original name was Nguyễn Văn Vịnh. He joined the Indochinese Communist Party in the mid-1930s and apparently spent most of the Second World War in a French prison. He worked for the Party in Central Vietnam until his rise to the Politburo in 1951. During the First Indochina War Thanh was made a general of the People's Army of Vietnam. From 1965 until his death he  served as the leading strategist and military commander of COSVN, the southern headquarters of communist military and political operations within the Republic of Vietnam. In 1967, he presented plans for what was to become the Tet Offensive to the Politburo, but died shortly after receiving permission to implement his plan.

Revolutionary cause

Nguyễn Chí Thanh was born on January 1, 1914, in the village of Quảng Điền in Thừa Thiên province. Thanh was son of Nguyễn Hán and Trần Thị Thiển, the sixth of 11 children. He grew up in a middle-class family, and was well educated. At the age of 14 his father died, his family became poor. Thanh then went to work as a farmer in order to make a living.

In 1937, Nguyễn Chí Thanh joined the Communist Party of Vietnam, Thanh became Party Secretary, in Thừa Thiên. From 1938 to 1943, Nguyễn Chí Thanh was arrested many times by the France colonial authorities. He was sent to the labor camps of Buôn Ma Thuột in Huế. After being released from prison he was sent to attend the National People's Congress in Tân Trào (1945). At the Party Congress in Tân Trào, he was nicknamed Nguyễn Chí Thanh, was elected to the Central Committee of the Communist Party and was appointed Secretary of the Central Committee of the Communist Party to monitor and organize the winning Central Government in the August Revolution.

At the Third National Party Congress in 1960 in Hanoi, Nguyễn Chí Thanh was elected to the Central Committee and was appointed to the Politburo and the Secretariat. In 1961, he was assigned to charge the Agriculture Board of the Party. During the Vietnam War, the Central Committee of the Party he returned to the military. Nguyen Chi Thanh is also a member of the military leadership of the Democratic Republic of Vietnam. In 1961, he continuously launched emulation movements in cooperatives, helping to stabilize the development situation in agricultural production in the North. From 1965 to 1967, he was assigned to the South, served as Secretary of the Central Department of South Vietnam, and the Political Commissar of the Liberation Army of the South. This time he took the name of Sáu Vi. When writing newspapers, he often took the pen name Trường Sơn. At the battlefield, he was the tactician of the South Vietnamese Liberation Army with the motto "Hold the enemy belt that hit", this approach uses maneuver to limit the fire's superiority of American troops.

The Vietnamese claim that Nguyễn Chí Thanh died in Hanoi on July 6, 1967, due to a heart attack in Hanoi whilst reporting to President Hồ Chí Minh on the situation in the South. The United States claims that Thanh was severely wounded during a B-52 raid on COSVN, evacuated overland to Phnom Penh and then flown to Hanoi where he died of his wounds. In the aftermath of Thanh's death the party purged dozens of senior members who held more moderate positions in contrast to the more belligerent stance of Lê Duẩn and his allies. Phạm Hùng another close ally of Lê Duẩn was appointed to replace Thanh as head of COSVN.

References

External links
Bibliography: Writings of Nguyen Chi Thanh

1914 births
1967 deaths
People from Thừa Thiên-Huế province
Generals of the People's Army of Vietnam
Members of the 2nd Politburo of the Workers' Party of Vietnam
Members of the 3rd Politburo of the Workers' Party of Vietnam
Members of the 3rd Secretariat of the Workers' Party of Vietnam
Members of the 1st Central Committee of the Indochinese Communist Party
Members of the 2nd Central Committee of the Workers' Party of Vietnam
Members of the 3rd Central Committee of the Workers' Party of Vietnam
Vietnamese nationalists
North Vietnamese military personnel of the Vietnam War